Carlow–Kilkenny is a parliamentary constituency represented in Dáil Éireann, the lower house of the Irish parliament or Oireachtas. The constituency elects 5 deputies (Teachtaí Dála, commonly known as TDs) on the system of proportional representation by means of the single transferable vote (PR-STV).

History and boundaries
The constituency of Carlow–Kilkenny has been used at Irish elections since the election of the Second Dáil at the 1921 general election. Prior to Irish independence, elections to the UK Parliament were held in three single-seat constituencies, known as Carlow, Kilkenny North and Kilkenny South, and it was these three constituencies that elected members of the First Dáil. Carlow–Kilkenny did not exist between 1937 and 1948, when it was replaced by the constituencies of Carlow–Kildare and Kilkenny.

From the 2020 general election, the constituency has spanned the entire area of County Kilkenny and the entire area of County Carlow, taking in the parts of Carlow which had been in the Wicklow constituency since the 1997 general election.
 		 	
The Electoral (Amendment) (Dáil Constituencies) Act 2017 defines the constituency as:

TDs

TDs 1921–1937

TDs since 1948

Elections

2020 general election

2016 general election

2015 by-election

2011 general election

2007 general election

2002 general election
Séamus Pattison was Ceann Comhairle at the dissolution of the 28th Dáil and therefore deemed to be returned automatically. The constituency was treated as a four-seater for the purposes of calculating the quota.

1997 general election

1992 general election

1989 general election

1987 general election

November 1982 general election

February 1982 general election

1981 general election

1977 general election

1973 general election

1969 general election

1965 general election

1961 general election

1960 by-election
Following the death of Fine Gael TD Joseph Hughes, a by-election was held on 23 June 1960. The Elections Act 1960 enabled the election to be held the same day as the 1960 local elections, using the same administrative apparatus. The Dáil seat was won by the Fianna Fáil candidate Patrick Teehan.

1957 general election

1956 by-election
Following the death of Fianna Fáil TD Thomas Walsh, a by-election was held on 14 November 1956. The seat was won by Fianna Fáil candidate Martin Medlar.

The surplus votes of the elected candidate were distributed after being declared elected because there was a possibility another candidate could have reached the threshold of a third of a quota which would have meant their election deposit was returned to them.

1954 general election

1951 general election

1948 general election
The poll was postponed due to the death of outgoing Fine Gael TD Eamonn Coogan during the campaign.

1933 general election

1932 general election

1927 by-election
W. T. Cosgrave was also elected for the Cork Borough constituency and resigned his seat in Carlow–Kilkenny following the election. A by-election was held on 3 November 1927 and the seat was won by the Cumann na nGaedheal candidate Denis Gorey.

September 1927 general election

June 1927 general election

1925 by-election
Following the resignation of Cumann na nGaedheal TD Seán Gibbons, a by-election was held on 11 March 1925. The seat was won by the Cumann na nGaedheal candidate Thomas Bolger.

1923 general election

1922 general election

1921 general election

|}

See also
Dáil constituencies
Elections in the Republic of Ireland
Politics of the Republic of Ireland
List of Dáil by-elections
List of political parties in the Republic of Ireland

References

External links
Oireachtas Constituency Dashboards
Oireachtas Members Database

Politics of County Carlow
Politics of County Kilkenny
Dáil constituencies
1921 establishments in Ireland
1937 disestablishments in Ireland
Constituencies established in 1921
Constituencies disestablished in 1937
1948 establishments in Ireland
Constituencies established in 1948